The 1968 Akron Zips football team represented Akron University in the 1968 NCAA College Division football season as an independent. Led by eighth-year head coach Gordon K. Larson, the Zips played their home games at the Rubber Bowl in Akron, Ohio. They finished the regular season with a record of 7–2–1, ranked No. 17 in the nation, and were invited to play in the Grantland Rice Bowl, functionally the Mideast regional championship game for the NCAA's College Division, against the Louisiana Tech Bulldogs.

After their postseason loss, the Zips finished the season 7–3–1, having outscored their opponents 327–172 in total.

Schedule

References

Akron
Akron Zips football seasons
Akron Zips football